James Kennedy Logan (8 May 1844–8 November 1912) was a New Zealand inspector and superintendent of telegraphs. He was born in West Kilbride, Ayrshire, Scotland on 8 May 1844.

References

1844 births
1912 deaths
People from North Ayrshire
New Zealand engineers
Telegraph engineers and inventors
Scottish emigrants to New Zealand